This article lists Roman Catholic schools, colleges and universities in the Roman Catholic Archdiocese of Washington -- also known as the Archdiocese of Washington Catholic Schools

Colleges and universities

Secondary schools

Grade schools

Former schools

Colleges and universities

Secondary schools

Primary schools

References 

Roman Catholic Archdiocese of Washington
Schools in the Roman Catholic Archdiocese
Washington